The Briones Valley is a major geological feature of Contra Costa County, California and runs between Mount Diablo and the county seat of Martinez. Also, it is the seat of many riparian watersheds, especially of Alhambra Creek.

References

Valleys of Contra Costa County, California
Valleys of California